The 1976 World Cup took place December 9–12 at the Mission Hills Country Club in Rancho Mirage, California, United States. It was the 24th World Cup event. The tournament was a 72-hole stroke play team event with 48 teams. Each team consisted of two players from a country. The combined score of each team determined the team results. The Spanish team of Seve Ballesteros and Manuel Piñero won by two strokes over the United States team of Jerry Pate and Dave Stockton. The individual competition for The International Trophy, was won by Ernesto Perez Acosta of Mexico, three strokes ahead of six players, who tied second.

Teams 

(a) denotes amateur

Source:

Scores
Team

International Trophy

Sources:

References

World Cup (men's golf)
Golf in California
World Cup golf
World Cup golf
World Cup golf